Albert Halsall (19 April 1942 – 25 August 2011) was an English professional rugby league footballer who played in the 1960s and 1970s.

Background
Albert Halsall's birth was registered in Wigan district, Lancashire, and his death aged 69 was registered in Wigan, Greater Manchester, England.

Playing career

County honours
Albert Halsall represented Lancashire on three occasions while at St. Helens.

Championship final appearances
Albert Halsall played left-, i.e. number 8, scored 3-tries, and was man of the match winning the Harry Sunderland Trophy in St. Helens' 35–12 victory over Halifax in the Championship Final during the 1965–66 season at Station Road, Swinton on Saturday 28 May 1966, in front of a crowd of 30,165, and played left- in St. Helens' 24–12 victory over Leeds in the Championship Final during the 1969–70 season at Odsal Stadium, Bradford on Saturday 16 May 1970.

County League Championships
Albert Halsall played in St. Helens' victories in the Lancashire County League during the 1965–66 season, 1966–67 season and 1968–69 season.

Challenge Cup Final appearances
Albert Halsall played left-, i.e. number 8, in St. Helens' 21–2 victory over Wigan in the 1966 Challenge Cup Final during the 1965–66 season at Wembley Stadium, London on Saturday 21 May 1966, in front of a crowd of 98,536.

County Cup Final appearances
Albert Halsall played left-, i.e. number 8, in St. Helens' 4–7 defeat by Leigh in the 1970 Lancashire County Cup Final during the 1970–71 season at Station Road, Swinton on Saturday 28 November 1970, and played left- in Swinton's 11–25 defeat by Salford in the 1972 Lancashire County Cup Final during the 1972–73 season at Wilderspool Stadium, Warrington on Saturday 21 October 1972.

References

External links

Search for "Halsall" at rugbyleagueproject.org
Profile at saints.org.uk
(archived by web.archive.org) Len Killeen – Sad news to report… (with photograph of Albert Halsall)

1942 births
2011 deaths
English rugby league players
Lancashire rugby league team players
Oldham R.L.F.C. players
Rugby league players from Wigan
Rugby league props
Rugby league second-rows
Salford Red Devils players
St Helens R.F.C. players
Swinton Lions players